Deputy or depute may refer to:

 Steward (office)
 Khalifa, an Arabic title that can signify "deputy"
 Deputy (legislator), a legislator in many countries and regions, including:
 A member of a Chamber of Deputies, for example in Italy, Spain, Argentina, or Brazil.
 A member of a National Assembly, as in Congo-Brazzaville, Congo-Kinshasa, Costa Rica, France, Pakistan, Poland or Quebec.
 A member of the Dáil Éireann (Lower House of the parliament of the Republic of Ireland) 
 A member of the States of Guernsey or the States of Jersey elected by a parish or district
 Deputy (Acadian), a position in 18th-century Nova Scotia, Canada
 Deputy Führer, a title for the deputy head of the Nazi Party
 A subordinate
 Deputy premier, a subordinate of the Premier and next-in-command in the cabinet of the Soviet Union and its successor countries, including:
 First Deputy Premier of the Soviet Union
 Deputy Premier of the Soviet Union, a subordinate of the Premier and the First Deputy Premier and third-in-command of the Soviet Government
 Deputy Prime Minister of the United Kingdom
 Deputy sheriff, deputized by a sheriff to perform the same duties as the sheriff
 Deputy Director of the Central Intelligence Agency
 White House Deputy Chief of Staff
 Deputy marriage commissioner
 Deputy governor
 Deputy mayor
 Deputy overman (pit deputy) in a mine
 Deputy Speaker, in a legislative assembly

Film, theatre and television
Deputy (TV series), American police drama starring Stephen Dorff
The Deputy, US title of The Representative, a play by Rolf Hochhuth
The Deputy (TV series), American western television series with Henry Fonda
The Deputy (film), 2004 BBC political comedy with Jack Dee

Other uses
 Deputy, Indiana, a small town in the United States
 Deputy Dawg, a Terrytoons cartoon character

See also
People's Deputy (disambiguation)
 Deputy lieutenant